Lynne Doreen Richardson is an American emergency physician and health services researcher. She is a professor at Icahn School of Medicine at Mount Sinai. Richardson is a member of the National Academy of Medicine.

Early life and education 
Richardson is from New York. She earned a bachelor's degree in life sciences and management from Massachusetts Institute of Technology. She completed a medical degree from Albert Einstein College of Medicine. Richardson conducted her residence in emergency medicine at Jacobi Medical Center and completed a research fellowship with AAMC Health Services Research Institute. She became board certified in Emergency Medicine in 1985.

Career 
Richardson is a professor of emergency medicine, health evidence, and policy at Icahn School of Medicine at Mount Sinai. She is the Vice Chair for Academic, Research and Community Programs of the Department of Emergency Medicine at Icahn.

Awards and honors 
Richardson was elected to membership in the National Academy of Medicine in 2016.

Personal life
Richardson's daughter, Kristin Richardson Jordan, is the presumptive incoming New York City Councilmember for the 9th District, covering Harlem, after winning the 2021 Democratic primary.

References

External links
 

Living people
Year of birth missing (living people)
Scientists from New York (state)
Physicians from New York (state)
21st-century American physicians
20th-century American physicians
20th-century African-American women
21st-century African-American physicians
20th-century African-American physicians
African-American women physicians
Members of the National Academy of Medicine
20th-century American women physicians
21st-century American women physicians
20th-century American women scientists
21st-century American women scientists
American emergency physicians
20th-century American scientists
21st-century American scientists
Massachusetts Institute of Technology alumni
Albert Einstein College of Medicine alumni
Icahn School of Medicine at Mount Sinai faculty
American women academics
21st-century African-American women